If Our Hearts Could Only See is an album led by saxophonist Billy Harper recorded in 1997 and released on the Japanese DIW label.

Reception 

In his review for AllMusic, Greg Turner states "This is one of 1997's best releases and a wonderful addition to Harper's slender discography".

Track listing 
All compositions by Billy Harper except as indicated
 "The Seventh Day" - 8:30
 "Time and Time Again" - 8:06
 "My One and Only Love" (Robert Mellin, Guy Wood) - 5:28
 "Egypt" - 6:20
 "Speak to Me of Love, Speak to Me of Truth" - 7:35
 "If One Could Only See" - 6:00
 "The One Who Makes the Rain Stop" - 7:54
 "I Move Silently Throughout This World" (Billy Harper, Vernel Lillie) - 4:48
 "World Without End" - 6:59

Personnel 
Billy Harper - tenor saxophone, vocals
Eddie Henderson - trumpet
Francesca Tanksley - piano
Clarence Seay - bass
Newman Taylor Baker - drums

References 

1998 albums
Billy Harper albums
DIW Records albums